Arthur Aimé Bruneau (March 4, 1864 – December 1, 1940) was a Canadian politician.

Born in St-Athanase d'Iberville, Canada East, the son of J. J. Bruneau and Marie Louise Bruneau, Bruneau was educated at the College of the Sacred Heart,
Sorel, and at the Jesuits' College, Montreal. He then entered the law department of Université Laval, following at the same time the study of law in the office of Hon. R. Laflamme. In January 1887, he was admitted to the Quebec Bar, and at once established himself in Sorel.

At the by-election of 1892, he was acclaimed as the Liberal candidate for Richelieu for the House of Commons of Canada. He was re-elected in 1896, 1900, and 1904. He resigned in 1907 when he was appointed as a Judge of the Superior Court of Quebec.

Electoral record 

ශ

External links
 

This article incorporates text from The Canadian album: men of Canada, Vol. 4, a publication now in the public domain.

1864 births
1940 deaths
Liberal Party of Canada MPs
Members of the House of Commons of Canada from Quebec
Université Laval alumni